Daniel Ndunguidi Gonçalves, better known as Daniel Ndunguidi or simply Ndunguidi, (born 1956) is a former Angolan football player.

Ndunguidi, whose career peaked in the 1980s while playing for Primeiro de Agosto as a forward, is widely considered Angola's most prominent football player, following independence. His fame and talent is only matched by that of Petro Atlético's José Saturnino de Oliveira aka "Jesus". In 1979, an attempt by Sporting Clube de Portugal to sign him was barred for political reasons as was another attempt by Benfica de Portugal in 1990.

On November 30th 1991, a farewell match was played between Primeiro de Agosto and Petro de Luanda, in honour of Ndunguidi and ''Jesus" Saturnino.

Throughout his career, from 1976 to the late 1980s, Ndunguidi has made 44 appearances for the Angolan national football team.

After ending his career as a player, he followed a short coaching career.  As a coach, he led Primeiro de Agosto to league titles in 1998 and 1999.

At present, he has been serving as an adviser to the chairman of Primeiro de Agosto.

References

External links
Ndunguidi Gonçalves Daniel - International Appearances

1957 births
Living people
Angolan footballers
Angola international footballers
Atlético Petróleos de Luanda players
C.D. Primeiro de Agosto players
C.D. Primeiro de Agosto managers
People from Cabinda Province
Association football forwards
Angolan football managers